Villafuerte is a surname. Notable people with the surname include:

Amílcar Augusto Villafuerte Trujillo (born 1964), Mexican politician affiliated with the PVEM
Brandon Villafuerte, American baseball player
Edwin Villafuerte, Ecuadoran footballer
Jaime Villafuerte (born 1920), Filipino former sports shooter
José Voltaire Villafuerte Tenorio (born 1956), Ecuadorian retired footballer
Juan Villafuerte, Ecuadorian painter
Juan Rodríguez de Villafuerte, a Spanish conquistador
Luis Raymund "LRay" Favis Villafuerte Jr. (born 1968), Filipino politician 
Luis Robredo Villafuerte, Sr. (1935-2021), Filipino politician
Miguel Luis Villafuerte (born 1989), Filipino politician and model                        
Noel Nieva Villafuerte, International Visual artist

See also
Villafuerte, Michoacán, town in Mexico
Villafuerte de Esgueva, municipality in Castile-León, Spain